The 2002–03 Sri Lankan cricket season featured two Test series with Sri Lanka playing against Bangladesh and New Zealand.

Honours
 Premier Trophy – Moors Sports Club
 Premier Limited Overs Tournament – Bloomfield Cricket and Athletic Club 
 Most runs – SKL de Silva 938 @ 42.63 (HS 133)
 Most wickets – PN Ranjith 69 @ 17.10 (BB 6-27)

Test series
Bangladesh made its first Test tour of Sri Lanka in July–August 2002, playing 2 Tests and 3 LOIs.  Sri Lanka won the Test series 2-0:
 1st Test @ Paikiasothy Saravanamuttu Stadium, Colombo – Sri Lanka won by an innings and 196 runs
 2nd Test @ Sinhalese Sports Club Ground, Colombo – Sri Lanka won by 288 runs

Sri Lanka and New Zealand played 2 Tests which were both drawn:
 1st Test @ Paikiasothy Saravanamuttu Stadium, Colombo – match drawn
 2nd Test @ Asgiriya Stadium, Kandy – match drawn

References

External sources
  CricInfo – brief history of Sri Lankan cricket
 CricketArchive – Tournaments in Sri Lanka

Further reading
 Wisden Cricketers' Almanack 2004

Sri Lankan cricket seasons from 2000–01